"I Can't Help Myself (Sugar Pie Honey Bunch)" is a 1965 hit song recorded by the Four Tops for the Motown label.

Written and produced by Motown's main production team Holland–Dozier–Holland, "I Can't Help Myself" is one of the most well-known Motown recordings of the 1960s and among the decade's biggest hits. The single topped the Billboards R&B chart for nine weeks (being named the biggest R&B single of the year by Billboard) and also peaked at number one on the Hot 100 for two non-consecutive weeks, from June 12 to June 19 and from June 26 to July 3 in 1965. It replaced "Back in My Arms Again" by labelmates The Supremes. It was first unseated at number one by "Mr. Tambourine Man" by The Byrds, then regained the top spot before being replaced by the Rolling Stones blockbuster "(I Can't Get No) Satisfaction". Billboard ranked the record as the second biggest single of 1965. "I Can't Help Myself" was the Four Tops' first Top 40 single in the UK, peaking at 23 in the summer of 1965, then reaching 10 on its spring 1970 re-release.

The song finds lead singer Levi Stubbs, assisted by the other three Tops and The Andantes, pleadingly professing his love to a woman: "Sugar pie, honey bunch/I'm weaker than a man should be!/Can't help myself/I'm a fool in love, you see."  The melodic and chordal progressions are very similar to the Supremes' 1964 hit "Where Did Our Love Go," also written by Holland-Dozier-Holland. According to Allmusic critic Ed Hogan, the title "I Can't Help Myself" is an oblique acknowledgment by Dozier that he could not resist recycling his previous hit. The bracketed title 'Sugar Pie, Honey Bunch' appears only on certain oldie reissues of the single.

Billboard described the song as a "spirited, fast-paced wailer performed in [the Four Tops'] unique style." Cash Box described it as "a rollicking hand-clappin' thumper about a fella who is delighted 'cause he's head-over-heels with the gal of his dreams." Rolling Stone magazine ranked the song #483 on their list of the 500 Greatest Songs of All Time. It has been covered extensively since 1965, including versions done for several television commercials. In 2019, Applebee's used the song for one of their advertisements.

Personnel
 Lead vocals by Levi Stubbs
 Background Vocals by Abdul "Duke" Fakir, Renaldo "Obie" Benson, Lawrence Payton, and The Andantes: Jackie Hicks, Marlene Barrow, and Louvain Demps
 Instrumentation by The Funk Brothers and the Detroit Symphony Orchestra (strings)
Bass by James Jamerson
 Baritone saxophone by Mike Terry
 Written by Brian Holland, Lamont Dozier, and Edward Holland, Jr.
 Produced by Brian Holland and Lamont Dozier

Chart performance
All-time charts

Certifications

Cover versions
The Supremes recorded a cover of this song between 1965 and 1966, released on their number-one album, The Supremes A' Go-Go. Their backing band, The Funk Brothers, was also the Four Tops' backing band at the time and comprising most, if not all, of the same musicians as on the original number-one single. In 1967, the Four Tops themselves recorded a special Italian language version, entitled Piangono gli uomini (The men cry).

In the winter of 1969, Johnny Rivers covered the song. His rendition became a number-two hit in South Africa.

Donnie Elbert hit number 22 on the Billboard Hot 100 in 1972 with his cover of this song, which was a follow-up to his cover of the Supremes' "Where Did Our Love Go." In Canada, it reached number 37.

In 1980, Bonnie Pointer had a disco crossover hit, with the song peaking at number 40 on the pop singles chart, number 42 on the soul singles chart, and number four on the dance chart. In Canada, it reached number 43 on the Top 100 Singles chart. The song also peaked at number 52 in Australia.

A cover by American country music group Billy Hill peaked at number 58 on the Billboard Hot Country Singles chart in 1989. In 1992, Australian girl group Teen Queens released a version that peaked at number 28 on the Australian Singles Chart.

The "Motorcity All-Stars" released a rerecorded version of song in 1989 on Ian Levine's Motown revival label Motorcity. The ensemble group was put together from as many former Motown singers as producer Levine could assemble. Levi Stubbs's brother Joe called Levi over to record the song, and both brothers feature on the track, along with singers Sammy Ward, Cal Gill of The Velvelettes, and Carolyn Crawford and C.P. Spencer of The Originals, all of whom had previously recorded at Motown. Many other former Motown associates can be seen in the background of the accompanying video, including Berry Gordy's ex-wife Raynoma Gordy Singleton and former head of artist development Maxine Powell.

American musician Kid Rock has performed the song in concert on his 2013 tour. He later included a cover of the song on his 2017 album Sweet Southern Sugar. On the album it was titled "Sugar Pie Honey Bunch".

 La Toya Jackson version 

"I Can't Help Myself'''" is a 1995 single by American singer La Toya Jackson, taken from her album Stop in the Name of Love'', released by KOCH International. The single's B-side, a cover of the Supremes' "Baby Love", is also taken from the album.

Track list

References

1965 singles
1980 singles
Four Tops songs
Bonnie Pointer songs
Billy Hill (band) songs
Irma Thomas songs
Billboard Hot 100 number-one singles
Cashbox number-one singles
Songs written by Holland–Dozier–Holland
Dance-pop songs
Motown singles
Song recordings produced by Brian Holland
Song recordings produced by Lamont Dozier
1965 songs
Song recordings produced by Jeffrey Bowen
Johnny Rivers songs